Ismet Ekmečić (born 2 February 1969) is a retired Slovenian footballer who played as a forward. While playing for Olimpija, he was the top scorer of the 1997–98 Slovenian PrvaLiga season with 21 goals.

External links
 PrvaLiga profile 
  

Living people
1969 births
People from Velenje
Slovenian people of Bosniak descent
Association football forwards
Yugoslav footballers
Slovenian footballers
Slovenian expatriate footballers
FK Rudar Prijedor players
NK Zadar players
NK Rudar Velenje players
NK Olimpija Ljubljana (1945–2005) players
NK Maribor players
ND Gorica players
Croatian Football League players
Slovenian Second League players
Slovenian PrvaLiga players
Slovenian expatriate sportspeople in Croatia
Slovenian expatriate sportspeople in Austria
Expatriate footballers in Croatia
Expatriate footballers in Austria